San Antone is a 1953 American Western film directed by Joseph Kane and starring Rod Cameron, Arleen Whelan, Forrest Tucker, Katy Jurado.

Plot
Confederate army officer Brian Culver comes to propose marriage to Julia Allerby, but she is distracted by Chino Figueroa's plans to leave her ranch. She tries to persuade Chino to keep working for her, first by seducing him, which fails, then by false accusations that he attacked her.

Culver is angry enough when civilian Carl Miller turns up with a troop movement that he, Miller, will lead. Carl is a friend of Chino's and in love with Chino's sister, Mistania. As usual, Julia intervenes and attempts to use her wiles on Carl, then becomes furious when he slaps her face.

Riding through a canyon where he expects Culver's soldiers to be attacked, Carl and the soldiers are deserted by Culver and end up captured. By the time Carl is released and returns to San Antonio, Chino has taken some of Culver's men hostage while others have taken jobs with wealthy rancher John Chisum.

Carl discovers that Culver murdered his father. A desperate Julia and Cutler are trying to get across the border. Carl ultimately decides to let them go, believing they deserve each other.

Cast
Rod Cameron as Carl Miller
Arleen Whelan as Julia Allerby
Forrest Tucker as Lt. Brian Culver
Katy Jurado as Mistania Figueroa
Rodolfo Acosta as Chino Figueroa
Roy Roberts as John Chisum
Bob Steele as Bob Coolidge
Harry Carey, Jr. as Dobe Frakus
James O'Hara as Jim Dane 
Andy Brennan as Ike
Richard Hale as Abraham Lincoln
Argentina Brunetti as Mexican Woman
Douglas Kennedy as Captain Garfield
Paul Fierro as Bandit Leader
George Cleveland as Colonel Allerby

References

External links 

 

1953 films
American Western (genre) films
1953 Western (genre) films
Republic Pictures films
Films directed by Joseph Kane
American black-and-white films
1950s English-language films
1950s American films